Bir Pind is a village in Nakodar. Nakodar is a tehsil in the city Jalandhar of Indian state of Punjab.

About Bir Pind 
Bir Pind is approximately 425 kilometers from New Delhi and almost 120 kilometers from Amritsar. Nawa Pind Shonkia Da is the neighbouring village of Bir Pind.  A project to build a Primary school, Secondary school and a Plus 2 School started in April 2008 and is completed in Spring 2011.

References

Villages in Jalandhar district
Villages in Nakodar tehsil